Mshak ( meaning The Toiler) was an Armenian language literary and political daily newspaper (weekly when established) published from 1872–1920 in Tiflis, Russian Empire (now Tbilisi, Georgia).
It was founded by Grigor Artsruni. 

Mshak was famous particularly for its serialization of notable Armenian literary works, such as Jalaleddin. Mshak was also known for its publication of liberal ideas, promoting the creation of a united Armenian state inside the Russia. In 1921, after the Soviet invasion of Georgia, Mshak, along with other anti-Bolshevik media, was closed.

Editors 

The following is the list of the editors of Mshak:

See also 
Armenians in Tbilisi
Armenian literature

References

Newspapers published in the Russian Empire
Publications established in 1872
Armenian-language newspapers
Mass media in Tbilisi
1872 establishments in the Russian Empire